Brahim Taleb (born 16 February 1985) is a Moroccan long-distance runner who specializes in the 3000 metres steeplechase.

He finished fifth at the 2001 World Youth Championships and fourth at the 2006 African Championships. He also competed at the 2007 World Championships and the 2008 Olympic Games without reaching the final.

At the 2012 Summer Olympics, he reached the final and finished in 11th.

His personal best time was 8:07.02 minutes, achieved in July 2007 in Heusden-Zolder.

References

1985 births
Living people
Moroccan male long-distance runners
Moroccan male steeplechase runners
Athletes (track and field) at the 2008 Summer Olympics
Athletes (track and field) at the 2012 Summer Olympics
Olympic athletes of Morocco
Sportspeople from Rabat
World Athletics Championships athletes for Morocco
20th-century Moroccan people
21st-century Moroccan people